Víctor Gay Zaragoza (born 19 June 1982 in Barcelona, Spain) is a writer, storyteller, trainer and consultant on storytelling. He is author of the essays "Filosofía Rebelde" (Rebel Philosophy), "50 libros que cambiarán tu vida" (50 books that will change your life) and the historical novel "El defensor" (The defender).

Career as a writer  
At 26, he published his first book Filosofía Rebelde (Editorial Kairos), which is an essay on the common essences of religions and philosophies from around the world. At 28, he published his second book 50 libros que cambiarán tu vida (Alienta), a literary criticism book. His third book El Defensor (Columna y Suma de Letras) is a historical novel set in 1940 (Nationalist Spain era) during the days of the trial and execution of Catalan president, Lluís Companys. The protagonist is Ramon de Colubí, Companys military defense lawyer. Both individuals are relatives of the author.

Discovery of the relationship between Lluís Companys and his lawyer 
During the research phase of El defensor, Zaragoza discovered that Ramon de Colubí and Lluis Companys were also related; a relationship that had never been unearthed by biographers and historians. The novel's documents contain birth certificates which prove that the grandfather of Companys (Ramon Maria Jover i Viala) was a first cousin of Colubí's grandmother (María de la Asunción de Viala Masalles), and at the same time relatives of the author.

Literary criticism 
His books Filosofía rebelde and El Defensor received positive reviews in relevant newspapers, such as El País and La Vanguardia (Spain) or El Espectador and El Tiempo (Colombia). His other book 50 libros que cambirán tu vida reached number 1 rank amongst the best-selling books at amazon.es.

Trainer and consultant on storytelling 
Gay Zaragoza is a trainer, consultant and lecturer on storytelling. While writing El Defensor, he created his own methodology which combines narrative with his personal experience as a trainer and consultant. Currently he helps individuals and organisations becoming true storytellers to create their own stories and communicate it better both on offline and online channels (transmedia storytelling). More than 4000 people and companies in Spain and LATAM have taken part in his projects.

Published books 
 Filosofía Rebelde (Editorial Kairós), ensayo.
 50 Libros que cambiarán tu vida (Alienta), ensayo.
 El Defensor (Columna y Suma de Letras), novela histórica.

References

1982 births
Living people
Spanish novelists